Laurie is an EP by singer-songwriter Daniel Johnston. It was his second release with Seminal Twang in the United Kingdom.

Johnston was gaining popularity and was soon to be picked up by his first major label, Atlantic Records, for the 1994 album Fun. Meanwhile, he had minor releases, including an earlier EP released by Seminal Twang called Big Big World.

Background

Writing & Recording 
The song 'Whiz Kid' dates back to Johnston's 1988 cassette Merry Christmas, on which a shorter version, only featuring the song's chorus, performed on Chord Organ features.

The EP was recorded in December 1989 in Johnston's bedroom in New Cumberland, West Virginia, just one month before Johnston's 11th album, 1990, was released. Recording sessions for 1990 had concluded over a year earlier, and Johnston had spent most of the time in-between institutionalized at Weston State Hospital. The 'Laurie sessions were produced by Brett Hartenbach, who plays guitar on all tracks alongside Mark Hartenbach, who plays guitar and harmonica, and is credited as songwriter for 'Whiz Kid.' The tracks were mixed by Brett and Kevin Brown at Brown & Brown Recording Studios.

Three months later, Johnston performed at SXSW 1990, although he played no tracks he had written for the still unreleased EP, he did debut 4 new pieces. One of which, Tell Me Now, would later be recorded, along with the title track from the Laurie EP, for his 12th album, Artistic Vice.

 Release 
The EP was released in April 1992 by UK based independent record label Seminal Twang, shortly after the release of Artistic Vice. In 2010 an extended version was released by Eternal Yip Eye Music, featuring 10 minutes worth of bonus tracks, made up of both short unfinished songs and early versions of tracks from Artistic Vice. The physical version features three songs omitted from the digital version, two of which are from the Merry Christmas album. The track 'The Monster Inside of Me' also featured on the Spanish anthology album The Ruta 66 Album' in 1991.

Track listing

2010 Special Edition

Digital Version

Credits

Musicians 

 Daniel Johnston: Piano, Guitar & Vocals
 Brett Hartenbach: Guitar 
 Mark Hartenbach: Harmonica & Guitar

Production 

 Producer: Brett Hartenbach
 Mixed By: Brett Hartenbach & Kevin Brown

References

Daniel Johnston albums
1992 albums